Pedoptila ubangiana is a moth in the Himantopteridae family. It was described by Arnold Schultze in 1931. It is found in the Central African Republic.

References

Endemic fauna of the Central African Republic
Moths described in 1931
Himantopteridae